Wiggins Airways is an American cargo airline based in Manchester, New Hampshire, operating from Manchester–Boston Regional Airport. It is a subsidiary of Ameriflight.

History
Wiggins Airways was founded in 1929, by E.W. Wiggins, operating out of Manchester, New Hampshire. Wiggins Airways was bought out by its employees in the creation of an Employee Share Ownership Plan in 1985. Wiggins currently employs over 160 people.

In December 2014, Ameriflight acquired Wiggins Airways (48 aircraft and 100 employees), which resulted in Ameriflight becoming the largest regional air cargo carrier in the world, with 218 aircraft in its fleet. Ameriflight elected not to continue to operate Wiggins' FBO and airline service departments, resulting in these departments being sold to Signature Flight Support.

Note: while Signature Flight Support operates fueling and deicing services to aircraft flying into Manchester Boston Regional Airport, Wiggins Airways does maintenance on their fleet, as well as servicing the airlines that serve the airport and general aviation aircraft.

Routes 
Wiggins Airways flies across New England and other Northeast states from its base in Manchester, utilizing a mix of Beechcraft Model 99 and Embraer EMB 110 Bandeirante aircraft.

As well as flying for UPS, Wiggins Airways operates flights for FedEx utilizing Cessna 208 Caravan in the 208B Cargomaster configuration.

Fleet
 Wiggins Airways operates a fleet of 51 aircraft. The majority of these aircraft operate as feeders for UPS Airlines and FedEx Express.

References

External links
 

Airlines established in 1929
Airlines based in New Hampshire
Cargo airlines of the United States
Companies based in Manchester, New Hampshire
1929 establishments in New Hampshire
American companies established in 1929
2014 mergers and acquisitions